The Seasons may refer to:

Literature and mythology
 Horae or the Seasons, in Greek mythology, the goddesses of the seasons
 The Seasons (poem), an 18th-century Lithuanian poem by Kristijonas Donelaitis
 The Seasons (Thomson), a 1726–1730 poetry cycle by James Thomson

Music and dance
 The Seasons (Haydn), an 1801 oratorio by Joseph Haydn
 The Seasons (Tchaikovsky), an 1876 set of character pieces for piano by Pyotr Ilyich Tchaikovsky
 The Seasons (ballet), an 1899 ballet by Marius Petipa to the music of Alexander Glazunov
 The Seasons (Cage), a 1947 ballet by Merce Cunningham to music of John Cage
 Ballet des Saisons (The Seasons), a 1661 ballet by Jean-Baptiste Lully
 "The Seasons", a song by Lynyrd Skynyrd from Skynyrd's First and... Last, 1978

Film and television
 The Seasons (film), a 1954 Canadian documentary short film
 The Seasons (TV series), a Hong Kong television drama series
 Seasons of the Year, a 1975 film by Artavazd Peleshyan

Visual arts
 The Seasons (Mucha), the name of three different series of color lithographs by Alphonse Mucha

See also 
 Season (disambiguation), including uses of Seasons and The Season
 The Four Seasons (disambiguation)